The 2014–15 Fort Wayne Mastodons men's basketball team represented Indiana University – Purdue University Fort Wayne during the 2014–15 NCAA Division I men's basketball season. The Mastodons, led by first year head coach Jon Coffman, played their home games at the Gates Sports Center, with one home game at the Allen County War Memorial Coliseum, and were members of The Summit League. They finished the season 16–15, 9–7 in Summit League play to finish in a tie for fourth place. They lost in the quarterfinals of The Summit League tournament to South Dakota. They were invited to the CollegeInsider.com Tournament where they lost in the first round to Evansville

Roster

Schedule

|-
!colspan=9 style="background:#4169E1; color:#FFFFFF;"|  Exhibition

|-
!colspan=9 style="background:#4169E1; color:#FFFFFF;"|  Regular season

|-
!colspan=9 style="background:#4169E1; color:#FFFFFF;"| The Summit League tournament

|-
!colspan=9 style="background:#4169E1; color:#FFFFFF;"| CIT

References

Purdue Fort Wayne Mastodons men's basketball seasons
IPFW
IPFW
Mast
2015 in sports in Indiana